Chemistry (from Egyptian kēme (chem), meaning "earth") is the physical science concerned with the composition, structure, and properties of matter, as well as the changes it undergoes during chemical reactions.

Below is a list of chemistry-related articles. Chemical compounds are listed separately at list of organic compounds, list of inorganic compounds or list of biomolecules.

A

B

C

D

E

F

G

H

I

J

K

L

M

N

O

P

Q

R

S

T

U

V

W

X

Y

Z

References 

 
Indexes of science articles